Tane Edmed (born 16 August 2000) is an Australian rugby union player who plays for the  in Super Rugby. His playing position is fly-half. He was named in the Waratahs squad for the 2021 Super Rugby AU season.

Reference list

External links
Rugby.com.au profile
itsrugby.co.uk profile

Australian rugby union players
Living people
Rugby union fly-halves
2000 births
Sydney (NRC team) players
New South Wales Waratahs players